Piper interruptum is a vine in the pepper family Piperaceae, native to the eastern parts of Southeast Asia and to Melanesia and Queensland.

Description
The leaves are ovate to narrowly ovate and mostly glabrous. There are 1 to 3 pairs of lateral veins, all of which divert from the midvein in the basal portion of the leaf.

This species is dioecious, meaning that functionally female and functionally male flowers are borne on separate plants.

Phenology
In Australia, flowering occurs from January to February, and fruits ripen from June to August.

Taxonomy
This species was first described by the Czech-German botanist Philipp Maximilian Opiz in 1828, his description was published in volume 1 of Carl Borivoj Presl's book Reliquiae Haenkeanae, seu, Descriptiones et icones plantarum.

Etymology
The species epithet is from the Latin interruptus, meaning "broken apart" or "interrupted". Opiz wrote in his description spadicibus cylindricus laxis, interruptis − "spadix cylindrical, lax, interrupted" − but it is unclear what he meant by the term.

Distribution and habitat
The distribution of this species is from Taiwan south to the Philippines, New Guinea, the Bismarck Archipelago, the Solomon Islands, Vanuatu and Queensland. In Queensland it occurs on the northeast coast from Cape Tribulation to Mackay.

Conservation
This species is listed by the Queensland Department of Environment and Science as least concern. , it has not been assessed by the IUCN.

Gallery

References

External links
 
 
 View a map of historical sightings of this species at the Australasian Virtual Herbarium
 View observations of this species on iNaturalist
 View images of this species on Flickriver

interruptum